Sarah Lawson (7 October 1955 – 8 November 2008) was an English film producer, radio producer and screenwriter.

Career
From 1982 to 1985, she was vice president of planning and development for DL Taffner Ltd, Los Angeles, and from 1995 to 1996 she was managing director of Anglia Television Entertainment Ltd – a joint venture between HBO and the ITV Company.

She is known for her work on The Dawning, starring Anthony Hopkins, Jean Simmons, Trevor Howard, Hugh Grant, Rebecca Pidgeon and Adrian Dunbar and several television films and series (such as Seekers, starring Academy Award winner Brenda Fricker, and Life After Life, written by Jonathan Lynn). She also founded a production company, Lawson Productions, through which she produced most of her projects. She took a hiatus in the late 1990s to start a family and pursue other non-producing media related activities. At the end of her life in 2008 she was working with Anne Chambers, author of the biography Granuaile: Ireland's Pirate Queen, on a film about Grace O'Malley. The project is slated for release in 2010, and is backed by the Irish Film Board.

Lawson also wrote and produced extensively for radio. She developed and executive produced the Baldi series, starring David Threlfall which aired its fifth season in 2008.

Lawson Productions
Lawson Productions was, from 1985 to 1988, with Taft Entertainment, known as the Taft Entertainment/Lawson Group. From 1988 it joined up with Universal Studios, with offices in London and Los Angeles. It became independent later in 1988,  with its first project being Life After Life. It is now primarily based in London and Dublin.

Personal life
Lawson was the daughter of Lt.-Col. Sir William Edward Harry Lawson, 5th Baron Burnham and Anne Petherick. Educated at Heathfield School in Ascot, Berkshire, she was a solicitor and a literary agent before becoming a film producer. From 1982 to 1991 she was married to Michael Grade, the current executive chairman of ITV; theatrical agent Anita Land introduced them. After their divorce she remarried, and had two children. Lawson was also a Governor at St. Patrick's Hospital, Dublin. During her hiatus from her media work, she spent time renovating the historic property Ardbraccan. She lived in Dublin and London.

Lawson died on 8 November 2008 after a long battle with cancer.

Selected credits

Producer

Writer

References

External links

The ScreenOnline Page – with Plot Outline, Project Informations and Clips from the show Natural Lies

Grace O'Malley – Anne Chambers' website
Lawson Productions at VisualNet
The BBC Page of the Baldi Radio Show

1955 births
2008 deaths
Daughters of barons
English film producers
English radio producers
British women film producers
Spouses of life peers
20th-century British screenwriters
20th-century English businesspeople
Women radio producers